Giorgi Tavadze (born 21 June 1955) is a Georgian former footballer.

References

External links

1955 births
Living people
Soviet footballers
Footballers from Georgia (country)
Association football defenders
FC Dinamo Tbilisi players
Soviet Top League players